Johan Henrik Dietrichs (2 June 1809–4 August 1886) was a Norwegian merchant and politician.

Dietrichs  was a merchant in Tønsberg, where he also served as mayor and as a member of City Council.  He was elected to the Norwegian Parliament in 1848, 1854, 1857 and 1859, representing the constituency of Tønsberg (Tønsberg og Holmestrand in 1854).

References

1809 births
 1886 deaths
Norwegian merchants
Members of the Storting
Vestfold politicians
Politicians from Tønsberg
19th-century Norwegian businesspeople